Hadas is a Kuwaiti Islamist political organization. Hadas may also refer to
 Hadas (name)
 Hadass, a branch of the myrtle tree used on the Jewish holiday of Sukkot
 Machzikei Hadas, a Modern Orthodox synagogue in Ottawa, Ontario, Canada